A permissive society, also referred to as permissive culture, is used to describe a society in which social norms become increasingly liberal, especially with regard to sexual freedom. 

The term is often used pejoratively by cultural conservatives to criticise what is seen as a breakdown in traditional values, such as greater acceptance of premarital sex, an increase in divorce rates, and acceptance of non-traditional relationships such as cohabitation and homosexuality. A.P. Herbert  was considered influential to the notion of permissiveness due to his reform of divorce laws in England. It was particularly used during the Sexual Revolution of the 1960s and 1970s in Western culture by opponents of the changes in attitudes of the era.

See also
Cultural liberalism

References

Sociological terminology